DAK is the Deutsches Afrika Korps, a German World War II unit.

DAK, Dak, dak, or variation, may also refer to:

Places
 Dak, Kerman, Kerman Province, Iran
 Dak, Sistan and Baluchestan, Sistan and Baluchestan Province, Iran
 Dakhla Oasis Airport (IATA airport code: DAK), Egypt

People
 Dakota North (speedway rider) (born 1991), nickname
 nickname of Dak Prescott (born 1993), American football player
 Kuzgbour Dak (fl. from 2012) South Sudanese footballer

Business
 Dak, a cargo vehicle by Tomos
 DAK Industries, a US discount electronics retailer
 Double Action Kellerman, a trigger-pull variant used by some SIG Sauer pistols
 Douglas Dakota, a WWII British RAF cargo plane, abbreviated as "Dak"

Other uses
 DAK (gene) (dihydroxyacetone kinase), a human gene
 ISO 639:dak or Dakota language, a Native American language
 Fung Dou Dak, one of the legendary Five Elders in Chinese folklore

See also

 
 Daks (disambiguation) (disambiguation)
 DAQ (disambiguation)
 DAC (disambiguation)
 Dack (disambiguation) (disambiguation)